Nazim Tahir oğlu Babayev (born 8 October 1997) is an Azerbaijani track and field athlete who specializes in the triple jump and long jump.

Biography 

In 2015, he won the triple jump competition at 2015 European Games in Baku. A month later, Babayev set a championship record, national junior record and world junior lead when he leaped 17.04m in the triple jump at 2015 European Athletics Junior Championships. Babayev competed in the 2016 Summer Olympics in Rio and the 2020 Summer Olympics in Tokyo, competing in the Men's triple jump.

Competition record

References

External links
 
 
 
 

1997 births
Living people
Azerbaijani male long jumpers
Azerbaijani male triple jumpers
Olympic athletes of Azerbaijan
Olympic male triple jumpers
Athletes (track and field) at the 2014 Summer Youth Olympics
Athletes (track and field) at the 2016 Summer Olympics
Athletes (track and field) at the 2020 Summer Olympics
European Games gold medalists for Azerbaijan
Athletes (track and field) at the 2015 European Games
Universiade medalists in athletics (track and field)
Universiade gold medalists for Azerbaijan
Universiade gold medalists in athletics (track and field)
Medalists at the 2017 Summer Universiade
Medalists at the 2019 Summer Universiade
European Athletics Indoor Championships winners
Islamic Solidarity Games competitors for Azerbaijan
20th-century Azerbaijani people
21st-century Azerbaijani people